Khazar or Khezer, in Iran, may refer to:
 Khazar 1
 Khazar 2
 Khazar 3